Dorcadion smyrnense is a species of beetle in the family Cerambycidae. It was described by Carl Linnaeus in 1757. It is known from Turkey.

References

smyrnense
Beetles described in 1757
Taxa named by Carl Linnaeus